The Tongp'o Line was a non-electrified  long railway line of the Korean State Railway in North Korea, connecting Chongsŏng on the Hambuk Line with Tongp'o.

History
It was originally opened by the Tomun Railway together with the Sangsambong−Chongsŏng section of the West Tomun Line on 1 November 1924. It was subsequently nationalised by the Chosen Government Railway in 1929, and from 1934 to 1945 it was managed by the South Manchuria Railway.  Finally, after the partition of Korea it became part of the Korean State Railway. The date of closure is not known.

Services
Coal was shipped from mines on this line to the Kim Chaek Iron & Steel Complex at Kimchaek and the Ch'ŏngjin Steel Works in Ch'ŏngjin, with the order of collection from each line arranged in the order of the total weight of the outbound cars.

Route 

A yellow background in the "Distance" box indicates that section of the line is not electrified.

References

Railway lines in North Korea
Standard gauge railways in North Korea